Marlene Warfield (born in Queens, New York) is an American actress.

Warfield has acted in films and American television. She portrayed the underground revolutionary Laureen Hobbs in the 1976 film Network and played Victoria Butterfield on the television sitcom Maude (1977–1978). Warfield starred in the play Janie Jones at the New Theatre, London (opened July 15, 1968).

She won the Clarence Derwent Award in 1969 for Outstanding Broadway Debut Performance and a Theatre World Award for the role of Clara in The Great White Hope, which she reprised in the 1970 film version.

Filmography

References

External links 
 
 

Living people
African-American actresses
People from Queens, New York
Actresses from New York City
American television actresses
American film actresses
20th-century American actresses
21st-century American actresses
20th-century African-American women
20th-century African-American people
21st-century African-American women
21st-century African-American people
Year of birth missing (living people)